Grassy Point may refer to:

Grassy Point, New York, was a hamlet in Rockland County
Grassy Point, Ohio, an unincorporated community in Hardin County